Prasanna Yoga Anjaneyar Temple is a Hindu temple devoted to Hanuman located near Madras Institute of Technology, Chromepet, Chennai, India.

History
The Hanuman idol was found sometime around 1930. Aanjaneya Ammal was a 13-year-old girl living in this area. She had a dream one night that the God wanted his temple to be built in this place. The next day she told her family.

Some days later, the late Mahaswami Sri Chandrashekarendra Saraswati happened to visit. Aanjaneya Ammal shared her dream with the Swamigal. The Swamigal immediately asked the people around him to go and look around the area of the current temple. The men went as advised and to their surprise found the idols lying there on the ground. Later with Tirumala Tirupati Devasthanams funding, the temple was constructed as per standard specifications.

Services
Puja is conducted every day and hundreds of residents throng this temple for the Lord's blessing. One can also find the photo of Aanjaneya Ammal inside the temple.

Every 6 months, the current poojari of the temple, Thiru Raghavan, conducts Pazhakapu (decoration with fruits) and Vennakapu (decoration with butter) of the lord's Vigraham (idol). As part of this ritual, donations are collected from interested devotees and the lord is decorated elaborately for the Puja. Fruits are used on some days and butter on some others.

Hanuman temples
Hindu temples in Kanchipuram district